Gordon Stanley Light (b 1944) was bishop of the Anglican parishes of the central interior from 2004 until 2008.

Light was educated at Carleton University and Trinity College, Toronto; and ordained in 1969. After a curacy at St. Paul's Cathedral, Kamloops he was the incumbent at St George, Edmonton then St Luke, Winnipeg. In 1984 he became dean of Cariboo, a post he held until he was appointed principal secretary to the primate, Michael Peers in 1992.

Light is a founding member of The Common Cup Company. He is a singer, songwriter and plays acoustic guitar.

Personal life 
Bishop Light has four children and two stepchildren. He lives in Kamloops BC, with his wife Barbara Liotscos.

References

Deans of Cariboo
21st-century Anglican Church of Canada bishops
1945 births
Living people
Carleton University alumni
Trinity College (Canada) alumni